Future History is the second studio album by American singer Jason Derulo, released on September 16, 2011.
As the executive producer of the album, Derulo collaborated with several record producers, including DJ Frank E, The Fliptones, The Outerlimits, Emanuel Kiriakou, RedOne, Jai Marlon and frequent collaborator J.R. Rotem, among others.

Upon its release, Future History received mixed reviews from music critics, that found the record to be too commercial and overcalculated. In the United States, the album debuted at number 29 on the Billboard 200, with first-week sales of 13,000 copies, significantly fewer than his debut album a year prior. The album reached the top ten in Australia, New Zealand and the United Kingdom, and the top twenty in Ireland and Switzerland.

Preceding the album's release was the lead single "Don't Wanna Go Home", which peaked at number 14 on the US Billboard Hot 100, and became Derulo's second number one on the UK Singles Chart. "It Girl" was released as the album's second single, which reached the top ten in several countries. "Breathing" and "Fight for You" were released with moderate success, as the album's third and fourth singles, respectively. "Undefeated" was released as the first single from the platinum edition of the album in 2012.

Background 

During an interview with Rap-Up magazine in May 2011, Derulo stated that the album was "a bunch of reinventions ... I’ve experienced so much in these last two years. When I recorded my first record I was 19 years old and now I'm 21." He also revealed that he showed more than one side with the album, stating "There's records on the album that are deeply emotional, very vulnerable, just all sorts of things." Derulo spoke more about the album in an interview with Billboard magazine, stating, "I like to write music based on who I am as a person, and this [album] is far different from the first one. On the first one I didn't have club tracks because I hadn't experienced that at all, and on this one my first record is about the most amazing party you've ever been to." During a promotional tour in the United Kingdom, Derulo told 4Music that the album was the greatest accomplishment of his life, "I've never been more excited about something. I've put a lot of blood, sweat and tears into this record." He further added that, "It's more growth than anything. I've grown more in these last two years than I've grown in my whole life." In an interview with The Daily Telegraph, Derulo stated that the title Future History reflects his desire for longevity in the music business. "I would like my music to live after me ... I want my music to be what is in the history books in the future."

Recording 
Most of Future History was recorded at Serenity West Recording Studio in Los Angeles, California; other recording sessions in Los Angeles took place at Chalice Recording Studios and Jim Henson Studios. Westlake Recording Studios in Hollywood, California was also used for recording. Derulo began working on the album in September 2010 and recorded 150 songs. He detailed his journey recording the album via a series of webisodes that were posted on his official website every Friday. In an interview with Billboard magazine, Derulo said that he recorded the track "Make It Up as We Go" while he was drunk, stating "cause that's just what it was at that time. I can never recapture that. Me being sober would just not be the same, because at that moment that's what I was feeling and how I'm saying it is exactly how it's supposed to be said." Derulo also revealed that while recording another song titled "Grieving", he was "crying in the booth ... it's just that emotional and personal to me." The album was mastered by Chris Gehringer at Sterling Sound in New York City.

Release and promotion 

The album's official cover was revealed on August 1, 2011, the same day the album's US release date was revealed. On August 4, Derulo performed "It Girl" and "Don't Wanna Go Home" on America's Got Talent. He also performed "Don't Wanna Go Home" at the 2011 Teen Choice Awards on August 7. Wearing a black leather jacket, T-shirt, skinny jeans and black leather gloves, Derulo performed the song with a troop of dancers, while a giant screen projecting his name in gold glittery lettering was shown on the stage backdrop. "That's My Shhh" was released for digital download in the United States on August 26, as the first promotional single from Future History. "Make It Up as We Go" was released on September 2, 2011, as the second promotional single from the album. "Breathing" and "Pick Up the Pieces" were both released on September 9 as the third and fourth promotional singles.

To promote the album, Derulo and the Knicks City Dancers held a flash mob outside Madison Square Garden in Manhattan, New York City on September 28. He performed several songs from the album as well as songs from his previous album, including "In My Head", while the Knicks City Dancers served as his back-up dancers. The following day, Derulo made a guest appearance on Live with Regis and Kelly to perform "Don't Wanna Go Home" and "It Girl". On September 30, he performed "It Girl" on The Wendy Williams Show. During a promotional tour in Australia, Derulo performed "It Girl" and "Don't Wanna Go Home" at the Westfield Parramatta shopping centre in Parramatta, New South Wales on October 16. He also performed the two songs on The X Factor Australia on October 18.

Singles 
"Don't Wanna Go Home" was released as the album's lead single. It was sent to contemporary hit radio in the United States on May 10, 2011, and released via iTunes Stores worldwide on May 20, 2011. The song was met with mixed reviews from music critics; some critics praised its production and lyrics, while others observed its lack of originality. "Don't Wanna Go Home" peaked at number 14 on the US Billboard Hot 100, and reached the top ten in Australia, Austria, Canada and Ireland. It also became Derulo's second number one single in the United Kingdom, after "In My Head" (2010). "It Girl" was released as the second single from the album on August 9, 2011. The song received positive reviews from music critics, who praised its catchy production and radio-friendly lyrics. "It Girl" peaked at number 17 on the US Billboard Hot 100, and reached the top ten in Australia, Denmark, Ireland, New Zealand and the UK.

"Breathing" was released to contemporary hit radio in Australia on October 24, 2011, and elsewhere from January 31, 2012, as the third single from Future History. The song garnered positive reviews from music critics, most of whom praised the production. "Breathing" peaked inside the top ten on the singles charts in Australia, Austria, Bulgaria, Germany, Slovakia and Switzerland. "Fight for You" was released as the album's fourth single on December 2, 2011. The song's production and Derulo's vocal performance garnered positive reviews from music critics, however, some criticized its lack of originality. "Fight for You" peaked at number 83 on the US Billboard hot 100, number five in Australia, and at number 15 in the UK. "Undefeated" was released as the first single from the platinum edition of Future History on May 22, 2012. The song peaked at number 90 on the US Billboard Hot 100, and reached number 14 in Australia.

Critical reception 

Future History received generally mixed reviews from music critics. At Metacritic, which assigns a weighted mean rating out of 100 to reviews from mainstream critics, the album received an average score of 59, based on five reviews, which indicates "mixed or average reviews". Allmusic editor David Jeffries complimented Derulo’s "conviction" and called the album "an ambitious stab at growth in the pop-R&B world of 2011", but found the songs formulaic, stating "Derulo’s still saying nothing" noting the album as a collection of "hooky, club cuts". MSN Music's Alex Thornton viewed that the album "may not be a huge expansion on his formula", but stated, "while Future History is chock-full of Auto-Tune and pyrotechnics, Derulo can actually sing and the effects are more of a means to an end than a crutch". Jody Rosen of Rolling Stone described its music as "party-hearty robo pop" and stated, "Derulo doesn't travel light; on nearly every song he stuffs his suitcase until the seams split. [...] But Derulo is endearingly into it – he attacks the songs – and he can sing. [...] He's just a bit too overeager – too determined to please all of the people all of the time." In Cuepoint, Robert Christgau gave the album a three-star honorable mention, which indicates "an enjoyable effort consumers attuned to its overriding aesthetic or individual vision may well treasure". He cited "Breathing" and "It Girl" as highlights and said Derulo was "definitely not as dumb as he pretends to think he is".

Entertainment Weeklys Brad Wete noted "several  attempts at home-run club records and huge ballads" and wrote that Derulo "swings hard, but often misses – perhaps his biggest problem  is that he's not rooted in any genre outside of people- pleasing pop", adding that he "should give true R&B a try." Michael Cragg of BBC Music criticized the "meaningless slogans and relationship clichés" in the lyrics and stated, "As with his self-titled debut, Future History is more of a collection of singles than an album, but it feels a little more calculated." Digital Spy critic Robert Copsey shared a similar sentiment and, despite complimenting the dance tracks "Breathing" and "Fight for You", he found "little in the way of surprises elsewhere". Caroline Sullivan of The Guardian criticized Derulo's "gauche declarations" and called Future History "an album that cleaves so closely to this year's ubiquitous pop/urban sound that you wonder whether the Florida-born crooner has an original idea in his head."

Commercial performance 
In the United States, Future History debuted at number 29 on the Billboard 200, with first-week sales of 13,000 copies. This was significantly lower than that of his previous album, Jason Derulo, which debuted at number 11 and sold 43,000 copies in its first week. It has sold 80,000 as of April 2014.

Track listing

Promo Box Set

Platinum Edition 

Notes
 – co-producer
 – vocal producer
 The CD deluxe edition is an autographed copy of Future History, and contains the music videos for "Don't Wanna Go Home" and "It Girl".
 The merchandise edition contains, a button set, poster, 2x silicone wristbands and three sticker sheets.

Sample credits
 "Don't Wanna Go Home" contains interpolates of "Day-O (The Banana Boat Song)" and contains samples of "Show Me Love".
 "Breathing" contains elements of "Pilentze Pee", written by Krassimir Tsvetano Kurkchiyski, Shope Trad and Folksong Thrace.
 "Make It Up as We Go" samples "A City Under Siege", performed by Boy 8-Bit.
 "Fight for You" contains an interpolation of "Africa", written by David F. Paich and Jeffrey T. Porcaro.
 "Pick Up the Pieces" samples "Open Your Eyes", written by Peter King and Lee Monteverde and performed by Koko.

Personnel 
Adapted from album booklet.

Creativity and management

Ashaunna Ayars – marketing
Jason Derulo –  executive producer
Kara DioGuardi – A&R
Jeff Fenster – A&R for Warner Bros. Records
Charles Hamilton – business affairs for Warner Bros. Records
Frank Harris –  A&R for 23 Management, executive producer, management
Liza Joseph – A&R administration and coordination
Frank Maddocks – art direction and design
James Minchin III – photography
Nick Spanos – additional center spread photo
Katy Wolaver – A&R coordination
Danny Zook – sample clearance
Corey Lloyd - sample clearance

Instruments and performance

BeatGeek – instruments and programming
Jason Derulo – lead vocals, background vocals
DJ Frank E – keyboards, drum and synth programming
Andrew Goldstein – additional keyboards and drum programming
Laila Khayat – background vocals on "Fight for You"
Samya Khayat – background vocals on "Fight for You"
Emanuel "Eman" Kiriakou – keyboards, whistle, guitars, bass, percussion, drum programming
Jens Koerkemler – additional keyboards and drum programming
Jacob Luttrell – keyboards
RedOne – instruments and programming, background vocals on "Fight for You"
Frank Romano – guitars
J.R. Rotem – instruments
Teddy Sky – background vocals on "Fight for You"
Geo Slam – instruments and programming
Gray Smith – synth and drum programming

Technical and production

BeatGeek – production
Jason Derulo – additional production
DJ Frank E – production
The Fliptones – production
Chris Galland – assistant mixing
Jesus Garnica – assistant mixing
Chris Gehringer – mastering
Serban Ghenea – mixing
John Hanes – engineer mixing
Justin Hergett – assistant engineer
Heather Jeanette – additional production
Jaycen Joshua – mixing
Rob Katz – engineer
Claude Kelly – vocal production
Emanuel "Eman" Kiriakou – production
Jens Koerkemler – engineering, editing
Gelly Kusuma – engineering, recording
Erik Madrid – assistant mixing
Manny Marroquin – mixing
Tony Maserati – mixing
Carlos "Los" McKinney – production
Charles Moniz – recording
Trevor Muzzy – mixing
Terius Nash – production
The Outerlimits – production
Jason Patterson – assistant engineer
Jai Marlon- production
Frank Romano – additional production
RedOne – production
Tim Roberts – additional production, assistant engineer mixing
Frank Romano – additional production
J.R. Rotem – production, mixing
Tatsuya Sato – assistant mastering
Phil Seaford – assistant engineer mixing
Geo Slam – production
Sidney Swift – additional engineering
Pat Thrall – vocal production, engineering
JD Walker – production

Charts

Weekly charts

Year-end charts

Certifications

Release history

References 

2011 albums
Albums produced by DJ Frank E
Albums produced by J. R. Rotem
Albums produced by The-Dream
Albums produced by Emanuel Kiriakou
Albums produced by RedOne
Jason Derulo albums
Warner Records albums